The , more formally  or  was one of the most senior offices in the Byzantine imperial chancery. Its holder was the keeper of the imperial inkstand, the kanikleion, which was shaped as a little dog and contained the scarlet ink with which the Byzantine emperor signed state documents. The office first appears in the 9th century, and was usually held in tandem with other government offices. In the Kletorologion of 899 it is ranked among the "special dignities", following the synkellos and preceding the protostrator. In the overall order of precedence, he ranked behind the chartoularios tou vestiariou and before the protostrator, and is recorded as usually holding the rank of protospatharios.

His proximity to the imperial person and the nature of his task made the  very influential, especially in formulating imperial chrysobulls. The office was often given to trusted aides by the emperors, who functioned as effective chief ministers: most notably Theoktistos under Michael III, Nikephoros Ouranos in the early reign of Basil II, the powerful Theodore Styppeiotes under Manuel I Komnenos, Nikephoros Alyates under John III Vatatzes and Michael VIII, and the scholar Nikephoros Choumnos, who also held the post of prime minister (mesazōn), under Andronikos II Palaiologos. The last recorded holder of this office was Alexios Palaiologos Tzamplakon .

In Constantinople, there also was a quarter on the shore of the Golden Horn named ta Kanikleiou, which took its name from the palatial residence built there by Theoktistos.

References

Sources

 

 

Byzantine palace offices